Look Away + 4 is the third EP from The Apples in Stereo. It contains five songs, featuring the song "Look Away" from the album The Discovery of a World Inside the Moone. The other four songs were previously featured on the Japanese version of the 1999 album Her Wallpaper Reverie.

Track listing 
All tracks written by Robert Schneider.
"Look Away" – 3:26
"Behind the Waterfall" – 2:35
"Everybody Let Up" – 2:08
"Her Pretty Face" – 2:59
"The Friar's Lament" – 1:04

Personnel

Performance
The Apples in Stereo:
Eric Allen - bass guitar, backing vocals
Hilarie Sidney - drums, percussion, lead and backing vocals
Chris McDuffie - organ, synthesizer, piano, backing vocals, percussion
John Hill - rhythm and acoustic guitars, backing vocals
Robert Schneider - lead, rhythm and acoustic guitars, piano, synthesizer, lead and backing vocals, percussion
Additional Players:
Rick Benjamin - trombone
Merisa Bissinger - flute and piccolo
Jason Abernethy - space bongos

Production
Look Away + 4 was produced by Robert Schneider with engineering by The Apples in Stereo with Robert Christiansen and Jim McIntyre. The album was recorded at Pet Sounds Recording Studio, Denver, Colorado, on 4-track, 8-track and 16-track tape machines. Additional production was conducted on The Elephant 6 Mainframe Computer. Album paintings by Steve Keene.

The Apples in Stereo albums
2000 EPs
SpinART Records EPs
The Elephant 6 Recording Company EPs